Thomas Q. Ashburn (November 17, 1874 – May 2, 1941) was a United States Army major general active during World War I.  Ashburn wrote a unit history of the 324th Field Artillery Brigade as well as articles on waterways, rivers, forest fires, and transportation.

Early life 
Ashburn was born in Batavia, Ohio. He graduated number sixty-one of sixty-seven from the United States Military Academy in 1897.

Career 
Ashburn's first duty was with the 25th Infantry at Fort Missoula, in Montana, after which he was transferred to the artillery. Ashburn was commissioned a captain in the 34th United States Volunteer Infantry and was shipped to the Philippines.

In May 1900, he commanded one column of the pursuit of Emilio Aguinaldo. He was made a brevet major for gallantry in action at San Jacinto on November 11, 1899. From 1901 to 1902, Ashburn was the aide to General Arthur MacArthur, after which he was stationed in Cuba to command the 18th, 19th, and 24th Companies of Coast Artillery. He returned from Cuba in 1903, graduated from the School of Submarine Defense in 1907, and served a second tour in the Philippines. During World War I, Ashburn commanded and took to France the 324th Field Artillery Brigade and the 158th Field Artillery in 1918.

Ashburn became chairman of the advisory board of the Inland Waterways Corporation and was made a brigadier general in 1924.
In 1927, he became a major general. In 1938, he retired from the army, but remained with the Inland Waterways Corporation until 1939.

Awards
Ashburn earned a Silver Citation Star and was commended publicly and personally by General John J. Pershing. He also received both the Croix de Guerre and Legion of Honor from France, as well as the Mexican Order of Military Merit and the Distinguished Service Medal from the United States.

Writings 
Ashburn authored History of the 324th Field Artillery and numerous articles dealing with military matters, river transportation, and forest fires.

Death and legacy
Ashburn died at age 66 on May 2, 1941.

Family
Colonel Percy Moreau Ashburn was his brother.  Brigadier General Julius Penn was his cousin.

References

Bibliography 
Ashburn, T. Q. History of the 324th Field Artillery, United States Army. New York: George H. Doran Co, 1919. 
Davis, Henry Blaine. Generals in Khaki. Raleigh, NC: Pentland Press, 1998.  
Marquis Who's Who, Inc. Who Was Who in American History, the Military. Chicago: Marquis Who's Who, 1975.  
"Thomas Quinn Ashburn, Major General, United States Army." Thomas Quinn Ashburn, Major General, United States Army. Arlington National Cemetery, n.d. Web. 09 Aug. 2016. <Thomas Quinn Ashburn, Major General, United States Army>

1874 births
1941 deaths
Military personnel from Ohio
United States Army generals of World War I
United States Army generals
United States Military Academy alumni
American male writers
Recipients of the Croix de Guerre (France)
Recipients of the Distinguished Service Medal (US Army)
People from Batavia, Ohio
Recipients of the Silver Star